Goudouko is a town in southern Ivory Coast. It is a sub-prefecture of Lakota Department in Lôh-Djiboua Region, Gôh-Djiboua District.

Goudouko was a commune until March 2012, when it became one of 1126 communes nationwide that were abolished.

In 2014, the population of the sub-prefecture of Goudouko was 26,641.

Villages
The 8 villages of the sub-prefecture of Goudouko and their population in 2014 are:
 Akridou-Laddé (6 383)
 Dougroulilié (1 070)
 Gbogoudou (1 003)
 Goudouko (6 026)
 Kazéribéri (5 719)
 Kouassililié (2 256)
 Niazaroko (1 893)
 Zozo-Oliziriboué (2 291)

References

Sub-prefectures of Lôh-Djiboua
Former communes of Ivory Coast